Choia is a genus of extinct demosponge ranging from the Cambrian until the Lower Ordovician periods.  Fossils of Choia have been found in the Burgess Shale in British Columbia; the Maotianshan shales of China; the Wheeler Shale in Utah; and the Lower Ordovician Fezouata formation.  It was first described in 1920 by Charles Doolittle Walcott.

Life habit
Choia was originally thought to be not attached to the sea bed: the living animal was originally thought to rest directly on the substrate, with the radiating spines from the edge of its flattish, conical body, giving an appearance not unlike that of the peak of a big top, with guy lines. Recently discovered fossils from Lower Ordovician Morocco show that the living animal was actually suspended high above the seafloor, attached via stalk-like spines derived from spicules.   Water is assumed to have entered the sponge parallel to the spines, being expelled, presumably, from a central opening. Species reached up to an average of 28 mm in diameter.

Presence in the Greater Phyllopod Bed
127 specimens of Choia are known from the Greater Phyllopod bed, where they comprise 0.2% of the community.

References

External links 
 
 Picture of C. utahensis fossil

Burgess Shale fossils
Burgess Shale sponges
Maotianshan shales fossils
Protomonaxonida
Early Ordovician extinctions
Prehistoric sponge genera
Sirius Passet fossils
Cambrian first appearances
Taxa named by Charles Doolittle Walcott
Fossil taxa described in 1920
Early Ordovician genus extinctions
Wheeler Shale

Cambrian genus extinctions
Ordovician genus extinctions